Otaika is a suburb of Whangārei 7 km south of the city in Northland, New Zealand. The Otaika Stream runs from the north west, through the area, and into the Whangārei Harbour. State Highway 1 runs through the locality. The hill Tikorangi (with a summit 161 m above sea level) lies to the South. Tikorangi is a source of limestone for Portland Cement.

The New Zealand Ministry for Culture and Heritage gives a translation of "place of lying in a heap" for Ōtāika.

History

In the 1830s, Okaika was a Māori village of Te Parawhau hapū. Tiakiriri was the chief. The first Pakeha settlers were Frederick and George Taylor, who were living at Otaika by 1856. More Pākehā settled further up the Okaika Valley around this time. George Edge's wandering geese were sometimes eaten by locals, leading to a nickname for the valley of "Kai-goose".

The local Toetoe Marae and Toetoe meeting house, located north of the village on the northern shores of the Otaika Stream, is a tribal meeting ground for the Ngāpuhi hapū of Te Parawhau and Te Uriroroi, and the Ngāti Whātua hapū of Te Uriroroi.

Demographics

Otaika-Portland had a population of 1,338 at the 2018 New Zealand census, an increase of 192 people (16.8%) since the 2013 census, and an increase of 231 people (20.9%) since the 2006 census. There were 444 households, comprising 687 males and 648 females, giving a sex ratio of 1.06 males per female. The median age was 41.2 years (compared with 37.4 years nationally), with 270 people (20.2%) aged under 15 years, 228 (17.0%) aged 15 to 29, 648 (48.4%) aged 30 to 64, and 195 (14.6%) aged 65 or older.

Ethnicities were 83.4% European/Pākehā, 30.5% Māori, 3.8% Pacific peoples, 2.0% Asian, and 1.6% other ethnicities. People may identify with more than one ethnicity.

The percentage of people born overseas was 11.2, compared with 27.1% nationally.

Although some people chose not to answer the census's question about religious affiliation, 58.1% had no religion, 27.4% were Christian, 2.5% had Māori religious beliefs, 0.2% were Muslim, 0.4% were Buddhist and 1.3% had other religions.

Of those at least 15 years old, 138 (12.9%) people had a bachelor's or higher degree, and 234 (21.9%) people had no formal qualifications. The median income was $31,200, compared with $31,800 nationally. 168 people (15.7%) earned over $70,000 compared to 17.2% nationally. The employment status of those at least 15 was that 570 (53.4%) people were employed full-time, 159 (14.9%) were part-time, and 36 (3.4%) were unemployed.

Education
Otaika Valley School is a coeducational contributing primary (years 1-6) school with a roll of  students as of

References

Whangarei District
Populated places in the Northland Region